"There Is Power in a Union" is a song written by Joe Hill in 1913. The Industrial Workers of the World (commonly known as the Wobblies) concentrated much of its labor trying to organize migrant workers in lumber and construction camps. They sometimes had competition for the attention of the workers from religious organizations. The song uses the tune of Lewis E. Jones' 1899 hymn "There Is Power in the Blood (Of the Lamb)".

"There Is Power in a Union" was first published in the Little Red Songbook in 1913, and has been recorded several times. 

Billy Bragg reused the title for his 1986 song "There Is Power in a Union" on the Talking with the Taxman About Poetry album, which is set to the tune of "Battle Cry of Freedom".

Lyrics and style

In popular culture
A version of the song (with altered lyrics) is used in the Wasteland 3 DLC The Battle of Steeltown (2021).

See also

 Wobbly lingo

References

1913 songs
Musical parodies
Songs critical of religion
Songs with lyrics by Joe Hill (activist)
Trade union songs